Rudník may refer to:

Rudník, Myjava District, Slovakia
Rudník, Košice-okolie District, Slovakia
Rudník (Trutnov District), Czech Republic